Clema is a genus of beetles in the family Buprestidae, containing the following species:

 Clema deserti Semenov-Tian-Shanskij, 1900
 Clema elegans Obenberger, 1923
 Clema freudei Cobos, 1963

References

Buprestidae genera
Taxa named by Andrey Semyonov-Tyan-Shansky